Splendrillia jarosae is a species of sea snail, a marine gastropod mollusk in the family Drilliidae.

Description

Distribution

References

jarosae
Gastropods described in 1991